Søren Larsen is a Danish football player.

Søren Larsen may also refer to:
Søren Larsen, Danish-built tall ship, now based in Australia
Søren Absalon Larsen (1871–1957), Danish physicist, known for the "Larsen Effect"
Soren Larsen (fictional ship)
Søren Sebber Larsen (born 1966), Danish composer
Søren Kusk (Søren Kusk Larsen, born 1960), Danish footballer and manager
Søren Larsen (footballer, born 1949)

Larsen, Soren